Aroga controvalva is a moth of the family Gelechiidae. It is found in China (Shaanxi).

The wingspan is about 18 mm. Adults are similar to Aroga velocella, but can be distinguished by the absence of the light line at three-fourths of the forewing.

References

Moths described in 1998
Aroga
Moths of Asia